James R. Flynn may refer to:

 James Flynn (academic) (1934–2020), New Zealand intelligence researcher
 Jim Flynn (songwriter) (James Ronald Flynn, born 1938), American country music songwriter

See also 
 James Flynn (disambiguation)